Joanne Lois Morley (born 30 December 1966) is an English professional golfer.

Morley was born in Sale. She was leading amateur at the Women's British Open in 1989 and 1993 and English Women's Strokeplay Champion in 1991 and 1992. She finished runner-up in the 1992 British Ladies Amateur. She played on the Great Britain and Ireland team in the 1992 Curtis Cup (winners) and the 1992 Espirito Santo Trophy (2nd place).

Morley turned professional in late 1993 and initially played on the Ladies European Tour (LET), where she came a career best sixth on the Order of Merit in 1996. She has won twice on the LET. She made her first Solheim Cup appearance that year. From 1997 to 2007, she played mainly on the U.S.-based LPGA Tour where her best finish was third. She returned to the LET in 2008. She was an assistant captain at the 2009 Solheim Cup.

Professional wins (2)

Ladies European Tour wins (2)
1996 Ladies' German Open
2000 stilwerk Ladies' German Open

Team appearances
Amateur
European Ladies' Team Championship (representing England): 1991, 1993
Vagliano Trophy (representing Great Britain & Ireland): 1991 (winners), 1993 (winners)
Curtis Cup (representing Great Britain & Ireland): 1992 (winners)
Espirito Santo Trophy (representing Great Britain & Ireland): 1992

Professional
Solheim Cup (representing Europe): 1996

References

External links
 dead
 dead

English female golfers
Ladies European Tour golfers
LPGA Tour golfers
Solheim Cup competitors for Europe
People from Sale, Greater Manchester
1966 births
Living people